The Thomas Lumb Three-Decker is a historic triple decker house in Worcester, Massachusetts.  It is an example of the style popular during Worcester's westward expansion, with well preserved Queen Anne styling.  Although many details have been lost due to residing since its listing in 1990 on the National Register of Historic Places, it retains decorative turned porch supports and balusters.  Thomas Lumb, its first owner, was a local saloon keeper, and its early tenants were ethnically diverse.

See also
Thomas Lumb Three-Decker (Dewey Street)
National Register of Historic Places listings in southwestern Worcester, Massachusetts
National Register of Historic Places listings in Worcester County, Massachusetts

References

Apartment buildings in Worcester, Massachusetts
Apartment buildings on the National Register of Historic Places in Massachusetts
Queen Anne architecture in Massachusetts
Houses completed in 1894
Triple-decker apartment houses
National Register of Historic Places in Worcester, Massachusetts